97.7 Charm Radio (DXSZ 97.7 MHz) is an FM station owned and operated by Polytechnic Foundation of Cotabato and Asia. Its studios and transmitter are located at Brgy. Ramon Magsaysay, Sindangan.

References

External links
Charm Radio Sindangan FB Page

Radio stations established in 2012
Radio stations in Zamboanga del Norte